St. Andrew's College, Prince Edward Island redirects to here.

St. Dunstan's University (SDU) is a former university which was located on the northern outskirts of Charlottetown, Prince Edward Island, Canada.  SDU merged with Prince of Wales College (PWC) in 1969 to form the University of Prince Edward Island.

St. Dunstan's College was founded by the Roman Catholic Diocese of Charlottetown on January 15, 1855 as a seminary which trained young men for the Catholic clergy.  The St. Andrew's College, founded in 1831, was its predecessor.

By the mid-20th century, the college had expanded into a small liberal arts university. A post-Second World War enrollment boom mandated an expansion which saw new residences and teaching buildings constructed on the campus located along Charlottetown's Elm Avenue (the Malpeque Road).  SDU received a provincial degree-granting charter in 1917 but didn't actually award its first bachelor's degrees until the spring 1941 convocation. SDU had formerly been affiliated with Université Laval, awarding joint degrees from the 1890s onward. Following the decision to start granting its own degrees, SDU severed the relationship with Laval by 1956. 

Similarly to PWC, SDU also operated a high school, offering senior matriculation to those students wishing to continue into academic or professional studies.

Saint Dunstan's sports teams were known as the Saints.

By the 1960s, the provincial government in Prince Edward Island began a critical study of its post-secondary education institutions (PWC and SDU), concluding that a merger to form a provincial university was the desired funding and service model for future students. The merger was not without controversy as emotions ran high among supporters of both institutions; however, in May 1969 the last classes graduated from PWC and SDU, and the institutions were merged into the University of Prince Edward Island, which opened for the first time in September 1969 on what had been the SDU campus. At the same time as UPEI was formed, Elm Avenue was renamed by the City of Charlottetown to University Avenue, a name by which it is still referred to. The PWC campus on Grafton Street was taken over by the provincial government and formed the basis for a community college known as Holland College.

Notable students and alumni
 Mike Duffy - Canadian Senator and journalist who briefly attended Saint Dunstan's University
 Jim Foley - CFL football player
 Bill MacMillan - NHL hockey player and coach
 Don McDougall - businessman
 James Cardinal McGuigan - Cardinal named by Pope Pius XII and Archbishop of Toronto, Ontario 
 James Jeffrey Roche - 19th-century Irish-American poet and diplomat

External links
 St. Dunstan's University history - provided by UPEI
 St. Dunstan's University Board of Governors - continuing to advance the mandate of SDU with religious education and scholarships

References

 
Educational institutions established in 1855
Defunct universities and colleges in Canada
Catholic universities and colleges in Canada
Educational institutions disestablished in 1969
Education in Charlottetown
University of Prince Edward Island
1855 establishments in the British Empire
1969 disestablishments in Prince Edward Island
Universities and colleges in Prince Edward Island